John Willie Drummond (September 29, 1919 – September 3, 2016) was an American politician. He was a Democratic member of the South Carolina Senate, who represented the 10th District from 1966 through 2008. He was also a member of the South Carolina House of Representatives from 1965 through 1966.

Early life and military service 
One of seven children of James William and Fannie Smith Drummond, John Drummond was born in Greenwood, South Carolina, though at some point the family moved to Ninety Six, South Carolina.

In World War II, Drummond held the rank of captain and piloted a P-47D Thunderbolt with the nose art "Raid Hot Mama" 405th Fighter Group. He was shot down over in 1944 near Giéville, France. During his time of service Drummond received the Decorated Distinguished Flying Cross, two Purple Hearts, nine Air Medals, and three Battle Stars.

After the war he returned to Ninety Six and married Holly Self. They had three children: John H. "Brick," and twins Richard S. "Dick," and Robert S. "Bob." He initially sold doughnuts at Golden Rings before he started Drummond Oil, an oil distribution business.

Political career and death 
Drummond was elected as a Democrat to the South Carolina House of Representatives in 1965. In 1966, he was elected to the South Carolina Senate where he would serve until his retirement in 2008, representing Senate District 10 which included the counties of Abbeville, Greenwood, and Laurens.

During his service he served on numerous committees, including as committee chairman for Ethics, Labor, Commerce, and Industry; Game and Forestry; and the Finance committees. From 1996 to 2001, Drummond served as the President Pro Tempore of the Senate. In 2001, the newly-minted Republican senate majority changed the body's rules regarding chairmanships and Hugh Leatherman replaced Drummond as chairman of the finance committee. Drummond helped preside over efforts by the Senate to remove the Confederate Flag from the State House grounds.

Drummond died on September 3, 2016.

References

External links
Project Vote Smart - Senator John W. Drummond (SC) profile
Follow the Money - John W. Drummond
2006 2004 2002 2000 1996 campaign contributions
John Drummond Papers at the University of South Carolina's South Carolina Political Collections

|-

|-

|-

|-

|-

1919 births
2016 deaths
Democratic Party South Carolina state senators
Democratic Party members of the South Carolina House of Representatives
People from Greenwood, South Carolina
Businesspeople from South Carolina
United States Army Air Forces pilots of World War II
20th-century American politicians
People from Ninety Six, South Carolina
20th-century American businesspeople